Darreh Sefid (also Romanized as Darreh Sefīd) is a village in Banesh Rural District, Beyza District, Sepidan County, Fars Province, Iran. At the 2006 census, its population was 217, in 40 families.

References 

Populated places in Beyza County